The 2018 Qatar Open was the second event of the 2018 ITTF World Tour. It was the first of six top-tier Platinum events on the tour, and took place from 8–11 March in Doha, Qatar.

Men's singles

Seeds

Draw

Top half

Bottom half

Finals

Women's singles

Seeds

Draw

Top half

Bottom half

Finals

Men's doubles

Seeds

Draw

Women's doubles

Seeds

Draw

References

External links

Tournament page on ITTF website

Qatar Open
2018 in Qatari sport
Qatar Open
Qatar Open
Sports competitions in Doha
Qatar Open